Mimoides euryleon, the false cattleheart swallowtail, is a species of butterfly in the family Papilionidae.

Subspecies
M. e. euryleon - Colombia
M. e. clusoculis (Butler, 1872) - Costa Rica, Panama
M. e. pithonius (Rothschild & Jordan, 1906) - Colombia
M. e. haenschi (Rothschild & Jordan, 1906) - Ecuador
M. e. anatmus (Rothschild & Jordan, 1906) - Ecuador
M. e. rodriquezi Le Crom, Constantino & Salazar, 2002 - Colombia

Description
Mimoides euryleon has a wingspan reaching . The basic color of the wings is iridescent black or dark brown, with white patches on the dorsal sides of the forewings and red patches on the hindwings. Also the undersides of the wings are iridescent black or dark brown, with small red spots in the basal area of the hindwings.

Description from Seitz

P. euryleon. The spots of the breast and abdomen red, the posterior abdominal segments with red lateral spots.
Forewing above with yellowish grey area before the hindmargin, hindwing with red discal area or band. Beneath the forewing without red basal spot, the hindwing with three, but the spot placed in the cell commonly only indicated or quite absent, the discal band smaller than above, pale red. Female similar to the male or different from it; in the latter case forewing with cell-spot and two discal bands, all white, recalling pausanius and protodamas f. choridamas. Scent-organ of the male usually present. Costa Rica toEcuador. — clusoculis Butl. (13 c). Discal area of the forewing white-grey; the red band of the hindwing broad, always entering the cell. Female similar to the male, the red band of the hindwing somewhat broader. Costa Rica; Chiriqui. — pithonius R. & J. Male: forewing with small or large grey spot; hindwing with 3—5 red discal spots, the red submarginal spots of the under surface of the hindwing very small or only indicated. Female with large cell-spot on the forewing and 2 large discal spots. West Colombia and Cauca Valley. — euryleon Hew. (13 c). Male : hindwing above mostly with 4 spots placed close to the cell and two small, less distinct spots before the abdominal margin; the discal spots on the underside pale red. female: the cell-spot of the forewing narrowed anteriorly, the band of the hindwing entering the cell. Male  with scent-organ. In Western Ecuador. — anatmus R & J. male : the grey area of the forewing extending from the hindmargin costad as far as the 2. median or beyond, often a grey streak in the cell; hindwing with 3 red spots, separated from the cell, often only the 3. spot distinct; beneath the forewing without white spot and the discal spots of the hindwing usually grey. Female not known. Scent-organ absent in the male. East Ecuador.

Distribution and habitat
This species is widespread in the Neotropical realm, in Costa Rica, Panama, Colombia, and Ecuador. It lives in the Andes at an elevation between 600 and 1600 m.

Biology
Caterpillars feed on Annona glabra and Guatteria oliviformis.

Gallery

References

Butler, A.G. (1872). Descriptions of new butterflies from Costa Rica., Butler, A. G. (1872) Descriptions of new butterflies from Costa Rica. Cistula entomologica 1 (4): 72-90
GloBIS (GART): Global Butterfly Information System. Häuser C., Holstein J. & Steiner A. (eds), 2008-11-23
Bisby F.A., Roskov Y.R., Orrell T.M., Nicolson D., Paglinawan L.E., Bailly N., Kirk P.M., Bourgoin T., Baillargeon G., Ouvrard D. (red.) (2011). Catalogue of Life

Specific

External links

 
Butterflies of America

 euryleon
Butterflies described in 1856
Papilionidae of South America